The IX Corps of the Ottoman Empire (Turkish: 9 ncu Kolordu or Dokuzuncu Kolordu) was one of the corps of the Ottoman Army. It was formed in the early 20th century during Ottoman military reforms.

Formation

Order of Battle, 1911 
With further reorganizations of the Ottoman Army, to include the creation of corps level headquarters, by 1911 the IX Corps was headquartered in Erzurum. The Corps before the First Balkan War in 1911 was structured as such:

IX Corps, Erzurum
28th Infantry Division, Erzurum
82nd Infantry Regiment, Erzurum
83rd Infantry Regiment, Erzurum
84th Infantry Regiment, Hasankale
28th Rifle Battalion, Yemen
28th Field Artillery Regiment, Erzurum
28th Division Band, Erzurum
29th Infantry Division, Bayburt
85th Infantry Regiment, Bayburt
86th Infantry Regiment, İşhan
87th Infantry Regiment, Trabzon
29th Rifle Battalion, Erzurum
29th Field Artillery Regiment, Bayburt
29th Division Band, Trabzon
Units of IX Corps
9th Rifle Regiment, Erzurum
21st Cavalry Regiment, Erzurum
2nd Horse Artillery Battalion, Erzurum
9th Engineer Battalion, Erzurum
9th Transport Battalion, Erzurum
Erzurum Fortified Area Command, Erzurum
12th Heavy Artillery Regiment, Erzurum
Engineer Platoon, Erzurum
Border companies x 12

Balkan Wars

Order of Battle, July 1913 
IX Corps (Caucasus)
33rd Division

World War I

Order of Battle, August 1914 
In August 1914, the corps was structured as follows:

IX Corps (Caucasus)
17th Division, 28th Division, 29th Division, 9th Cavalry Brigade

Order of Battle, November 1914, Late April 1915, Late Summer 1915, January 1916, August 1916 
In November 1914, Late April 1915, Summer 1915, January 1916, August 1916, the corps was structured as follows:

IX Corps (Caucasus)
17th Division, 28th Division, 29th Division

Sources

Corps of the Ottoman Empire
Military units and formations of the Ottoman Empire in World War I
History of Erzurum
1911 establishments in the Ottoman Empire